Oroperipatus balzani is a species of velvet worm in the Peripatidae family. Males of this species range from 27 mm to 31 mm in length and have 26 or 27 pairs of legs. The type locality is in Bolivia.

References

Onychophorans of tropical America
Onychophoran species
Animals described in 1897